is a former Japanese football player.

Playing career
Miyoshi was born in Kitakyushu on August 20, 1978. After graduating from high school, he joined J1 League club Avispa Fukuoka based in his local in 1997. He played several matches as substitute center back from 1999. However he could not play many matches. In 2002, he moved to J2 League club Sagan Tosu. He became a regular player as center back in 2002. However his opportunity to play decreased from 2003. In September 2004, he moved to Japan Football League (JFL) club ALO's Hokuriku. He played as regular player in 3 seasons. In 2007, he moved to Regional Leagues club Valiente Toyama. In July 2007, he moved to JFL club FC Ryukyu. He retired end of 2008 season.

Club statistics

References

External links

1978 births
Living people
Association football people from Fukuoka Prefecture
Japanese footballers
J1 League players
J2 League players
Japan Football League players
Avispa Fukuoka players
Sagan Tosu players
Kataller Toyama players
FC Ryukyu players
Association football defenders